Louise Godfrey is a former United States international lawn bowler.

Bowls career
Godfrey won a bronze medal at the 1977 World Outdoor Bowls Championship in Worthing in the triples event with Corinna Folkins and Dorothy Bacon.

References

American female bowls players